Nélson José Figueiredo Agra (born 6 January 1991) is a Portuguese professional footballer who plays as a midfielder.

Club career
Born in Póvoa de Varzim, Agra developed in the ranks of hometown club Varzim S.C. from 2004. He made his debut on 5 December 2010 in a 3–3 Liga de Honra away draw against F.C. Arouca, starting and being substituted for his cousin Salvador Agra with ten minutes left. He played four more games, all as starter, as the season ended with relegation.

In June 2013, Agra signed a three-year deal with Gil Vicente F.C. of the Primeira Liga. His playing time was limited to the Taça da Liga, and halfway through the campaign he dropped down a league to Leixões S.C. on a five-month loan.

Agra returned to Varzim, still in the third tier, ahead of 2014–15. They won promotion as runners-up, and he remained a regular in the second division; he left his hometown team in June 2021 and criticised manager António Barbosa for playing him at right-back in his last season.

References

External links

1991 births
Living people
People from Póvoa de Varzim
Sportspeople from Porto District
Portuguese footballers
Association football midfielders
Liga Portugal 2 players
Segunda Divisão players
Varzim S.C. players
Gil Vicente F.C. players
Leixões S.C. players
S.C. Salgueiros players
Portugal youth international footballers